Youssef Al Hamidi (born December 16, 1977) is a Syrian boxer who was a decorated amateur in the Syrian army and is now a professional boxer in the UK.

Amateur career
Al Hamidi Claims to have had around 150 amateur fights. He won a bronze medal in the Army world national championships. He was Syrian Champion for 10 years as well as Arabic Champion at 57KG.

Professional career
Youssef has been regarded as a dangerous journeyman fighter with the ability to upset the odds. On May 5, 2008 he upset Manchester prospect Anthony Crolla. Al Hamidi then fought English Lightweight Champion John Murray at the Trent FM Arena in Nottingham on a few hours' notice. The night did not go Al Hamidi's way and he eventually lost 77–75 on points.

Since then he has fought on a majority of under cards as an 'opponent' fighter. He has had 1 win since his upset of Crolla against Lee Jennings, and a reverse against Crolla losing 60–55 on the score cards.

Outside of boxing
Outside of boxing Youssef works as an ice cream seller for a Huddersfield ice cream van which helps him improve his spoken English.

References

External links
 

1977 births
Living people
Syrian male boxers
Lightweight boxers